The 2023 Khakassia head election will take place on 10 September 2023, on common election day, coinciding with the Supreme Council of Khakassia election. Incumbent Head Valentin Konovalov is running to a second term in office.

Background
Communist Abakan City Council Member Valentin Konovalov won 44.81% and unexpectedly bested incumbent Head of the Republic of Khakassia Viktor Zimin, who took 32.42% of the vote, in September 2018. Prior to the second round all candidates, except Konovalov, withdrew, so in an unprecedented single-candidate election Valentin Konovalov was elected Head of the republic with 57.6%. At the age of 31, Konovalov also became one of the youngest governors in Russia. United Russia also lost its majority in the simultaneous Supreme Council election.

Valentin Konovalov has been largely regarded as ineffective and inexperienced leader, as Khakassia's positions plummeted in socio-economical and governance ratings. Konovalov's administration was rocked with scandals, including problems with housing and utilities and criminal cases against republican officials. So it was not surprising that rumours arose about Konovalov's early resignation. Among potential variants of Konovalov's ouster was his election to the State Duma, as a result he was added to the CPRF party list for the 2021 Russian legislative election, where he was placed second in a regional group, that included Khakassia, Krasnoyarsk Krai and Tomsk Oblast. However, after the election the group received only one mandate which went to Krasnoyarsk businessman Ivan Babich.

The top candidate to replace Valentin Konovalov as Head of Khakassia is rumoured to be State Duma member Sergey Sokol. Sokol, a former Rostec executive and high-ranking government official in Krasnoyarsk Krai and Irkutsk Oblast, had never lived in Khakassia, however in the 2021 elections he successfully stood as a candidate in Khakassia constituency. In 2022 Sergey Sokol also was elected as Secretary of the United Russia Regional Office in Khakassia.

Candidates
In Khakassia candidates for Head can be nominated only by registered political parties. Candidate for Head of the Republic of Khakassia should be a Russian citizen and at least 30 years old. Candidates for Head should not have a foreign citizenship or residence permit. Each candidate in order to be registered is required to collect at least 10% of signatures of members and heads of municipalities (126–132 signatures). Also head candidates present 3 candidacies to the Federation Council and election winner later appoints one of the presented candidates.

Declared
 Valentin Konovalov (CPRF), incumbent Head of the Republic of Khakassia (2018–present)

Announcement pending
 Sergey Sokol (United Russia), Member of State Duma (2020–present), former acting Governor of Irkutsk Oblast (2009)

Potential
 Abrek Cheltygmashev, Head of Askizsky District (2002–present)
 Yevgeny Cheltygmashev, Member of Supreme Council of Khakassia (2019–present)
 Aleksey Lyomin (United Russia), Mayor of Abakan (2019–present)
 Aleksandr Zhukov (United Russia), Senator from Khakassia (2019–present)

Declined
 Innokentiy Stryapkov, Head of Beysky District (2019–present)
 Irina Voynova, Head of Altaysky District (2022–present), former Deputy Prime Minister of Khakassia (2018–2022)

See also
2023 Russian regional elections

References

Khakassia
Khakassia
Politics of Khakassia